The Umar Suleiman College of Education is a state government higher education institution located in Gashua, Yobe State, Nigeria. It is affiliated with the University of Maiduguri for its degree programmes. The current Ag. Provost is Hassan Bulama.

History 
The Umar Suleiman College of Education was established in 1986. It was formerly known as Advanced Teacher's College, Gashua.

Courses 
The institution offers the following courses;

 Biology Education
 Physical And Health Education
 Islamic Studies
 Primary Education
 Education and Economics
 Kanuri
 Home Economics
 Education and Mathematics
 Integrated Science
 Chemistry Education
 Agricultural Science
 Fine And Applied Arts
 Social Studies
 Education and English Language
 Education and Physics
 Education and French
 Business Education
 Education and History
 Primary Education Studies
 Special Education
 Early Childhood Care Education
 Arabic
 Education and Hausa
 Education and Geography
 Christian Religious Studies
 Computer Science Education
 Education and Islamic Studies

Affiliation 
The institution is affiliated with the University of Maiduguri to offer programmes leading to Bachelor of Education, (B.Ed.).

References 

Universities and colleges in Nigeria
1986 establishments in Nigeria
Educational institutions established in 1986
Yobe State